Ochraethes cinereolus is a species of beetle in the family Cerambycidae. It was described by Henry Walter Bates in 1892.

References

Clytini
Beetles described in 1892